Ekström is a surname of Swedish origin. The name commonly appears as Ekström in Sweden and Finland and as Ekstrom in English-speaking countries. Notable people with the surname include:

Anders Ekström, Swedish sailor
Anne-Marie Ekström, Swedish politician
Bernhard Ekström (1890-1956), Swedish politician
Clarence Ekstrom, United States Navy admiral
Folke Ekström, Swedish chess player
Hans Ekström (born 1958), Swedish politician
Jan Ekström, footballer
Jan Ekström (author)
Johnny Ekström, Swedish footballer
Martin Eugen Ekström  (1887–1954), Swedish military adventurer
Mary Ekstrom, American politician
Mattias Ekström,  Swedish racing driver
Mike Ekstrom, American baseball player
Per Ekström, Swedish landscape painter
Peter Ekström, Swedish sprint canoeist
Pirkko Irmeli Ekström, Finnish chess master
 Terje Ekström, Swedish designer, noted for the Ekstrem chair, produced by Stokke

See also
Ekstrom Ice Shelf, an ice shelf on Princess Martha Coast of Queen Maud Land in Antarctica 
William F. Ekstrom Library, main branch of the University of Louisville Libraries system in Kentucky

Swedish-language surnames